The 2004 Women's Pan American Cup was the 2nd edition of the Women's Pan American Cup. It was held between 21 and 28 April 2004 in Bridgetown, Barbados. The tournament doubled as the qualifier to the 2006 World Cup to be held in Madrid, Spain. The winner would qualify directly while the runner-up would have the chance to obtain one of five berths at the World Cup Qualifier in Rome, Italy.

Argentina won the tournament for the second consecutive time after defeating the United States 3–0 in the final, earning an automatic berth at the 2006 World Cup to defend their title obtained in 2002.

Umpires
Below are the 10 umpires appointed by the Pan American Hockey Federation:

Keely Dunn (CAN)
Soledad Iparraguirre (ARG)
Jun Kentwell (USA)
Ruth Limberg (BAR)
Lisa Marcano (TRI)
Renate Peters (GER)
Emma Simmons (BER)
Heather Smith (ENG)
Alicia Takeda (MEX)
Claudia Videla (CHI)

Results
All times are Atlantic Standard Time (UTC−04:00)

First round

Pool A

Pool B

Fifth to eighth place classification

Cross-overs

Seventh and eighth place

Fifth and sixth place

First to fourth place classification

Semi-finals

Third and fourth place

Final

Statistics

Final standings

Awards

Goalscorers

See also
2004 Men's Pan American Cup

References

External links
Official website

Women's Pan American Cup
Pan American Cup
Pan American Cup
Pan American Cup
Women's field hockey in Barbados
Sport in Bridgetown
International field hockey competitions hosted by Barbados
21st century in Bridgetown